Lane Township is a township in Greenwood County, Kansas, USA.  As of the 2000 census, its population was 167.

Geography
According to the USGS, it contains one cemetery, Virgil.

The stream of Greenhall Creek runs through this township.

References
 USGS Geographic Names Information System (GNIS)

External links
 US-Counties.com
 City-Data.com

Townships in Greenwood County, Kansas
Townships in Kansas